Misvær is a village in Bodø Municipality in Nordland county, Norway. The  village has a population (2011) of 245.

Misvær was the administrative centre of the former municipality of Skjerstad. Misvær Church is located in the village. The Oldereid Hydroelectric Power Station stands northwest of Misvær.

Misvær has its own weather station where accurate weather conditions are updated every 10 minutes. Historical weather data from the village is also available.

References

Bodø
Villages in Nordland
Populated places of Arctic Norway